Abação e Gémeos (officially: União das Freguesias de Abação e Gémeos) is a civil parish in the municipality of Guimarães, Portugal. It was formed in 2013 by the merger of the former parishes São Tomé de Abação and Gémeos. The population in 2021 was 2,683, in an area of 6.73 km2.

References

Freguesias of Guimarães
Towns in Portugal